Francis McGuinness (23 February 1867 – 30 November 1934) was an Irish politician.

Early life
McGuinness was born in 1867 in Cloonmore townland, Tarmonbarry, County Roscommon, to Martin McGuinness, landholder, and Rose Farrell.

Political life
He was an older brother of Joseph McGuinness, whose seat he won after the former's death. He was elected as a pro-Treaty Sinn Féin Teachta Dála (TD) to the 3rd Dáil at the 1922 general election for the Longford–Westmeath constituency.

He stood as a Cumann na nGaedheal candidate at the 1923 general election but was not elected. He was elected to the Seanad for 9 years in 1925 and did not seek re-election in 1934.

References

External links

1867 births
1934 deaths
Early Sinn Féin TDs
Cumann na nGaedheal senators
Members of the 3rd Dáil
Members of the 1925 Seanad
Members of the 1928 Seanad
Members of the 1931 Seanad
Politicians from County Longford
People from County Roscommon